Lookin' for Trouble is the 1980 debut album of Canadian rock band Toronto. Most tracks on the album were released as a singles. The U.S. release uses different cover artwork and excludes the final track "Let's Spend the Night Together". The album reached Platinum status in Canada, but did not chart in the USA. The original cover art was designed by Hugh Syme and was originally intended to be the cover art for Max Webster's High Class in Borrowed Shoes.

Track listing
All songs by Brian Allen, except where indicated

Side 1 Uptown
 "Even the Score" (Allen, Jimmy Fox) - 3:26
 "You Better Run" (Eddie Brigati, Felix Cavaliere) - 3:26
 "5035" - 3:20
 "Get Your Hands Off Me" (Allen, Holly Woods) - 3:33
 "Do Watcha, Be Watcha" - 3:43
 "Tie Me Down" - 3:41

Side 2 Downtown
"Don't Stop Me" - 4:06
"Lookin' for Trouble" - 3:45
 "Delirious" - 3:20
 "Shot Down" - 3:41
"Let's Spend the Night Together" (Jagger/Richards) - 4:02

Personnel

Band members
Holly Woods - lead vocals
Sheron Alton - guitar, backing vocals
Brian Allen - guitar, lead vocals
Scott Kreyer - keyboards, backing vocals
Nick Costello - bass guitar
Jimmy Fox - drums

Production
Bill Henderson, Brian MacLeod - producers
Rolf Henneman - engineer
Frank DeLuna - mastering

Charts

Certifications

References

1980 albums
Toronto (band) albums